José Juan Aguilar Mendoza (born May 19, 1990) is a Mexican professional baseball outfielder for El Águila de Veracruz of the Mexican League. Aguilar was selected for the Mexico national baseball team at the 2017 World Baseball Classic and 2019 exhibition games against Japan.

Career
On May 11, 2010, Aguilar was assigned to the Broncos de Reynosa of the Mexican League. He played for the Broncos through the 2014 season, and was assigned to the Leones de Yucatán on February 24, 2015. Aguilar did not play in a game in 2020 due to the cancellation of the Mexican League season because of the COVID-19 pandemic.

On March 4, 2023, Aguilar was traded to El Águila de Veracruz of the Mexican League for P Carlos Stiff Rodríguez.

References

External links

1990 births
Living people
Baseball players from Michoacán
Broncos de Reynosa players
Leones de Yucatán players
Mexican League baseball outfielders
Naranjeros de Hermosillo players
Venados de Mazatlán players
2017 World Baseball Classic players